may refer to:
D-8 Organization for Economic Cooperation
Economic Cooperation Organization
Organisation for Economic Co-operation and Development
Organization of the Black Sea Economic Cooperation